Johan Falk is a Swedish film series about a fictional police officer named Johan Falk, played by Jakob Eklund. It consists of 20 films that were released between 1999 and 2015. Fifteen of these films were released directly on DVD.

The last five films were shot in Gothenburg and Stockholm in the summer and autumn of 2014, and premiered in the summer of 2015.

List of films
The Trilogy (feature films)
Noll tolerans (1999) - Zero Tolerance
Livvakterna (2001) - Executive Protection
Tredje vågen (2003) - The Third Wave
Season 1
GSI - Gruppen för särskilda insatser (2009) - Special Operations Group
Vapenbröder (2009) - Brothers in Arms
National Target (2009)
Leo Gaut (2009)
Operation Näktergal (2009) - Operation Nightingale
De Fredlösa (2009) - The Outlawed
Season 2
Spelets Regler (2012) - Rules of the Game
De 107 Patrioterna (2012) - The 107 Patriots
Alla Råns Moder (2012) - Mother of All Robberies
Organizatsija Karayan (2012)
Barninfiltratören (2012) - The Child Infiltrator
Kodnamn Lisa (2012) - Codename Lisa
Season 3
Ur askan i elden (2015) - From the Ashes into the Fire
Tyst diplomati (2015) - Silent Diplomacy
Blodsdiamanter (2015) - Blood Diamonds
Lockdown (2015)
Slutet (2015) - The End

References

Further reading
 Swedish Cops: From Sjöwall and Wahlöö to Stieg Larsson by Michael Tapper, Intellect Ltd (2014)
 Scandinavian Crime Fictionedited by Paula Arvas and Andrew Nestingen, University of Wales Press (2011)
 Hanteraren - verklighetens Johan Falk by Dick Sundevall, Lind & Company Förlag (2013)

External links
 Johan Falk on IMDb
Så svek polisen verklighetens Frank Wagner 

Action film series
Fictional police officers in films
Fictional Swedish police detectives
Crime film characters
Film characters introduced in 1999
Swedish film series